Black film is a classification of film that has a broad definition relating to the film involving participation and/or representation of black people. The definition may involve the film having a black cast, a black crew, a black director, a black story, or a focus on black audiences. Academic Romi Crawford said, "I think a black film is a film work that takes into account in some way the relationship of African-Americans or blacks from the African Diaspora to filmmaking practice, means and industry. For me, it's in that relation between blacks and the film industry. How one engages in that relationship can be a mixture of black director and black acting talent; black director and black content in story; black content in story, no black director; black production money, nothing else that reads as black."

Chicago Tribunes Allan Johnson said in 2005 that the definition is blurred by black actors who star in films where their ethnicity is unrelated to their character, such as Denzel Washington, Jamie Foxx, Will Smith, and Halle Berry. Several black directors also have directed films unrelated to their ethnicity, including Antoine Fuqua, Angela Robinson, and Tim Story.

The American Black Film Festival was created by marketing executive Jeff Friday, who created the criteria for a film to qualify as a best picture candidate. A film must have eight points to qualify. Four points are given for each executive producer, producer, writer, director, and lead actor and actress involved with the film. Two points are given for each supporting actor and actress. Friday acknowledged the varied possibilities of the scoring system and said part of the goal of the award ceremony was also to recognize people of color behind the camera.

See also

Afrofuturism in film
List of black films of the 2010s
Blaxploitation
Race film
List of films about black girlhood
Hood film

References

Bibliography

African-American cinema
Film genres